Mil is a village in Ayn al-Arab District, Aleppo Governorate, Syria,
and according to the 2004 census, the village had a population of 328 residents.

Populated places in Ayn al-Arab District